The South Warrnambool Football Netball Club, nicknamed the Roosters, is an Australian rules football and netball club which competes in the Hampden Football League.

It is based in the regional Victorian city of Warrnambool and have played in the Hampden Football League since 1933.

History

Believed to have formed in 1902 the club initially played in the Warrnambool District Football Association competition in 1904 against Allensford, Rainbow and West End.

In 1918, South Warrnambool and Railways Football Club merged and won the Warrnambool District Football Association premiership, defeating Koroit.

In 1919 and 1920 St. Kilda player, Roy Cazaly coached South Warrnambool side during the finals series. It was Cazaly who saw the immense talent in Colin Watson and enticed him to try out with St. Kilda.

When the Warrnambool DFA decided to merge with the Corangamite FA to form the Western District Football Association in 1924, South Warrnambool merged with Warrnambool City to form the Warrnambool Football Club. The newly merged club, “Warrnambool” won the inaugural flag.

Three years later in 1927, South Warrnambool reformed as a stand alone club to provide stronger opposition to the Warrnambool team and entered the Western District Football Association.
 
The admission of Hamilton into the Western District FA in 1926, caused additional traveling costs and problems with extra time away from home. In 1926 Camperdown members voted with its feet and joined the Colac Football Association, only to re-join the Western District FA after a couple of seasons. In 1928, the league played zone football, a fixture for eastern clubs and one for the western clubs, with finals between the tops clubs at the end of the year.

In 1930 delegates voted to do away with zone football and have just one fixture the covered all clubs. 
The Hampden Football League was formed in 1930, when the four founding clubs broke away from the Western District FL. Terang and Camperdown did not want to continue to travel to Hamilton because their players were farmers who could not spend all day away from the farm to play football, as they had cows to milk. Mortlake agreed with Camperdown and Terang and resigned from the WDFL. Cobden was left with a predicament, and requested admittance to the new league.

The Western District FL countered by admitting Portland to the competition in 1930. This incurred extra travelling costs and it was noticeable that gate takings were down.

South Warrnambool were runners up in 1931 and again in 1932 in the Western District Football Association.

In 1933, South Warrnambool and Warrnambool joined the Hampden Football League, as takings at the gate had been greater when playing Camperdown or Terang that against any team in the WDFL.

Football Competitions Timeline
1902 to 1903 - SWFC established. Played friendly matches against other local teams
1904 - Warrnambool District Football Association
1905 to 1911 - Did no compete in any formal competition, but played friendly matches against other local teams
1912 to 1914 - Western District Football Association
1915 to 1917 - Club in recess due to World War I
1918 to 1923 - Warrnambool District Football Association
1924 to 1932 - Western District Football Association
1933 to 1940 - Hampden Football League
1941 to 1945 - Club in recess, due to World War II
1941 - Warrnambool District Football Association (South Warrnambool Reserves)
1946 to 2019 - Hampden Football League

Football Premierships
Seniors
Western District Football Association
1912 - South Warrnambool: 7.8 - 50 defeated Koroit: 3.18 - 36. Captained by Quinn.
1924 - Warrnambool (South Warrnambool/Warrnambool City): 13.10 - 88 defeated Terang: 11.11 - 77
Warrnambool District Football Association
1918 - South Warrnambool / Railways FC: 7.13 - 55 defeated Koroit: 6.4 - 40. Best on Ground - Colin_Watson
1921 - South Warrnambool: 10.13 - 73 defeated Koroit: 7.16 - 58 SWFC won the Sheldrick - Gill Curry Trophies.
Hampden Football League (11)
 1940 - South Warrnambool: 11.21 - 87 defeated Warrnambool: 10.7 - 67
 1954 - South Warrnambool: 9.8 - 62 defeated Terang: 5.8 - 38 
 1964 - South Warrnambool: 13.13 - 91 defeated Colac 10.5 - 65
 1969 - South Warrnambool: 12.17 - 89 defeated Mortlake 12.16 - 88
 1974 - South Warrnambool: 7.8 - 50 defeated Camperdown 6.6 - 42
 1990 - South Warrnambool: 23.21 - 159 defeated Colac 5.8 - 38
 1991 - South Warrnambool: 2.6 - 18 defeated Terang 1.6 - 12
 1994 - South Warrnambool: 19.15 - 129 defeated Camperdown 12.15 - 87
 1996 - South Warrnambool: 18.7 - 115 defeated Terang 14.9 - 93
 2006 - South Warrnambool: 17.15 - 117 defeated Camperdown 13.8 - 86
 2011 - South Warrnambool: 11.14 - 80 defeated Warrnambool: 5.9 - 39

Reserves
Hampden Football League (19)
 1962, 1964, 1967, 1968, 1971, 1974, 1975, 1976, 1983, 1986, 1989, 1990, 1996, 1998, 2001, 2004, 2006, 2008, 2011,

Thirds / Under 18's
Hampden Football League (16)
 1972, 1973, 1980, 1984, 1987, 1997, 1999, 2001, 2002, 2003, 2004, 2006, 2010, 2014, 2018, 2019,

Football Runners Up
Seniors
Western District Football Association
1913 - Warrnambool: 8.17 - 65 defeated South Warrnambool: 5.9 - 39 
1931 - Warrnambool: 6.6 - 42 defeated South Warrnambool: 5.10 - 40  (Best on Ground: Colin Watson)
1932 - Hamilton: 19.18 - 132 defeated South Warrnambool: 18.16 - 124 
Warrnambool District Football Association
1923 - Koroit: 13.10 - 88 defeated South Warrnambool: 6.9 - 45
Hampden Football League (10)
 1933 - Cobden: 6.13 - 49 def South Warrnambool: 6.6 - 42
 1939 - Warrnambool: 14.19 - 103 def South Warrnambool: 14.11 - 95
 1948 - Cobden: 11.13 - 79 def South Warrnambool: 10.6 - 66
 1985 - Colac - Coragulac: 22.14 - 146 def South Warrnambool: 14.6 - 90
 1988 - Warrnambool: 12.10 - 82 def South Warrnambool: 10.15 - 75
 1989 - Warrnambool: 21.14 - 140 def South Warrnambool: 11.11 - 77
 1992 - Warrnambool: 20.12 - 132 def South Warrnambool: 13.12 - 90
 1995 - Terang: 18.12 - 120 def South Warrnambool: 14.11 - 95
 1998 - Cobden: 15.6 - 96 def South Warrnambool: 11.10 - 76
 2010 - Warrnambool: 8.13 - 61 def South Warrnambool: 5.14 - 44

Reserves
Hampden Football League (9)
1963, 1965, 1973, 1988, 1997, 2003, 2010, 2017, 2018

Under 18 / Thirds
Hampden Football League (17)
1963, 1968, 1974, 1976, 1977, 1982, 1985, 1986, 1988, 1989, 1992, 1993, 1994, 1998, 2000, 2009, 2015,

Football League - Best and Fairest Awards
Seniors
Western District Football Association
1930 - Colin Watson

Hampden Football League
Maskell Medallist
1949 - Max Evans
1950 - Ray Lee 
1954, 1955 & 1957 - Ron Hoy 
1964 - Gary Hughson 
1981 - Tom Smith 
1989 - Phil Bradmore 
2005 - Ben Kilday

Reserves

VFL/AFL players
The following footballers played with South Warrnambool prior to making their VFL / AFL debut.

 1920 - Jimmy Milne - 
 1920 - Colin Watson - 
 1933 - Les Jago - 
 1945 - Clinton Wines - 
 1949 - Jack O'Rourke - 
 1955 - Frank Primmer - 
 1955 - Ron Hoy - 
 1958 - Bob Nisbet - 
 1960 - Frank Johnson - 
 1962 - Brian McMahon - 
 1965 - Denis Hughson - 
 1965 - Terry Broad - 
 1965 - Kevin Neale - 
 1968 - Phil Stevens - , 
 1970 - Alan Thompson - 
 1970 - John Burns - , 
 1976 - Jim Board - 
 1977 - Wayne Duke - 
 1977 - Ricky Barham - 
 1980 - Terry Domburg 
 1985 - David Crutchfield -  
 1986 - Darren Bolden -   
 1988 - Wayne Schwass -  , 
 1990 - Leon Cameron - 
 1990 - Richard Umbers - 
 1991 - Stephen Anderson - 
 1998 - James Rahilly - 
 2000 - Jonathan Brown - 
 2002 - Matt Maguire - , 
 2013 - Sam Dwyer - 
 2014 - Louis Herbert - 
 2017 - Hugh McCluggage - 
 2021 - Jamarra Ugle-Hagan

References

External links

 1949 - South Warrnambool FC: Seniors & Reserves Team photos
 Facebook page
 Official South Warrnambool FNC SportsTG website

Sport in Warrnambool
Hampden Football League clubs
1902 establishments in Australia
Sports clubs established in 1902
Australian rules football clubs established in 1902
Netball teams in Victoria (Australia)